Revolt of the Barbarians (Italian: La rivolta dei barbari) is a 1964 Italian film directed by Guido Malatesta.

Cast 
Roland Carey as Darius
Maria Grazia Spina as Lydia
Mario Feliciani
Gabriele Antonini
Andrea Aureli
Susan Sullivan
Gaetano Scala
Franco Beltramme
Gilberto Galimberti

External links 

1964 films
Italian drama films
1964 drama films
1964 adventure films
1960s Italian-language films
Films directed by Guido Malatesta
1960s Italian films